Lutetium(III) iodide or lutetium iodide is an inorganic compound consisting of iodine and lutetium, with the chemical formula of LuI3.

Preparation 

Lutetium(III) iodide can be obtained by reacting lutetium with iodine:

 2 Lu + 3 I2 → LuI3

Lutetium(III) iodide can also obtained by the reacting metallic lutetium with mercury iodide in  vacuum at 500 °C:

 2 Lu + 3 HgI2 → 2 LuI3 + 3 Hg

The elemental mercury generated in the reaction can be removed by distillation.

The lutetium(III) iodide hydrate crystallized from the solution can be heated with ammonium iodide to obtain the anhydrate.

Properties 

It is a brown, very hygroscopic solid with a bismuth(III) iodide-type crystal structure. In air, it quickly absorbs moisture and forms hydrates. The corresponding oxide iodide is also readily formed at elevated temperature.

Lutetium(III) iodide doped with cerium is designed for use in PET scanners. Lutetium iodide can be used together with yttrium iodide and gadolinium iodide in LuI3-YI3-GdI3 scintillators to detect neutron and gamma radiation.

References 

Lutetium compounds
Iodides
Lanthanide halides